Daniel Leopold Lipson (26 March 1886 – 14 April 1963) was a politician in the United Kingdom. Originally a teacher at Cheltenham College and later a headmaster, he became a member of Cheltenham Borough council, serving as mayor during the 1930s, before he was elected as an Independent Conservative Member of Parliament for the Cheltenham constituency at a by-election in 1937, the local Conservative party having refused to endorse him as its candidate following an anti-semitic whispering campaign.  He was re-elected at the general election of 1945 as a National Independent, but at the 1950 election his vote fell and he lost the seat to the Conservative candidate William Hicks Beach, coming third behind the Labour candidate.

Lipson was made an Alderman, and in 1953 an honorary Freeman of the Borough of Cheltenham.

A road on the Hesters Way housing estate in Cheltenham was named after him

He was also an enthusiastic supporter and a vice president of the Cheltenham YMCA.

References 

 
 Richard Kimber's political science resources: UK General Election results February 1950. 
 The Guardian, Friday 31 October 2003
 Gloucestershire County archives, Local Studies library

External links 
 

1886 births
1963 deaths
Members of the Parliament of the United Kingdom for English constituencies
UK MPs 1935–1945
UK MPs 1945–1950
Independent members of the House of Commons of the United Kingdom
Mayors of places in Gloucestershire
Jewish British politicians
YMCA leaders
Councillors in Gloucestershire
Politics of Cheltenham
Schoolteachers from Gloucestershire